Eden Gardens is a cricket ground in Kolkata, India. It is the home of the Bengal cricket team and the Indian Premier League's Kolkata Knight Riders, as well as being a Test and One Day International ground. It has a capacity of 90,000. The ground has held Test matches since 1934 and hosted its first One Day International in 1987.

In cricket, a five-wicket haul (also known as a "five-for" or "fifer") refers to a bowler taking five or more wickets in a single innings. This is regarded as a notable achievement. The first bowler to take a five-wicket haul in a Test match at Eden Gardens was Dattu Phadkar for India against Pakistan in 1952. Australia's Richie Benaud became the first to take two five-wicket hauls in the same match at Eden Gardens, when he took 6 for 52 and 5 for 53 in the second and fourth innings of the third Test of Australia's 1956–57 tour of India. As of August 2019, 42 Test match five-wicket hauls have occurred at the ground.

Two bowlers have taken five-wicket hauls during ODIs at Eden Gardens. The first player to do so was Allan Donald of South Africa, who achieved the feat when he took 5 wickets for 29 runs against India in 1991. The other five-wicket haul was made by India's Anil Kumble, which is also the best figures in ODI cricket at this ground. He took 6 for 12 against the West Indies in 1993.

Bangladeshi bowler Mustafizur Rahman is the only bowler to have taken a five-wicket haul in a T20I match held at the ground, doing so against New Zealand during the 2016 ICC World Twenty20.

Key

Tests

One Day Internationals

References

Indian cricket lists